Sirirampur Bhaunath is 851128, Sirirampur Bhaunath comes under Mansurchak post office. It is part of Mansurchak block, total 38 villages/localities come.
Sirirampur Bhaunath is located at Begusarai district of Bihar.

References

Villages in Begusarai district